Jarosław Olech (born January 6, 1974 in Pawłów, Starachowice County) is a Polish powerlifter.

Career
Jarosław is a three-times World Games gold medalist in the Men's Middleweight Powerlifting event. 
He has won the world title at the International Powerlifting Federation seventeen consecutive times in his lifting class.

References

External links
 

Polish powerlifters
1974 births
Living people
World Games gold medalists
Competitors at the 2009 World Games
Competitors at the 2013 World Games
Competitors at the 2017 World Games
20th-century Polish people
21st-century Polish people